The Burnie Dockers Football Club's Women's Team commenced playing in the newly branded Tasmanian Women's League (TWL) in 2013, transferring from the Yeomen Football Club. The Dockers competed in 3 consecutive grand finals taking out the TWL premierships in 2014 and 2016.

From 2017 the Women's Team will compete in the new Tasmania State League Women's.

2013 season 
The 2013 Season saw a massive step up in the professionalism of the women's team stepping into a State League Club environment.

Inaugural Head Coach: Darren 'Spanner' Eade

Team Manager: Sophie Edwards

Runner: Kim Eade

2014 season 
2014 saw Spanner return to the helm and lead the Women to their first Premiership.  In a year that saw the team only lose 1 match, they were able to beat out Clarence for the Premiership

Head Coach: Darren 'Spanner' Eade

Assistant Coach: Michael Marshall

Team Manager: Kim Eade

Runner: Kim Eade

2015 season 
2015 saw the team head back into the Grand Final, unfortunately this year they were unable to defend their 2014 Premiership

Head Coach: Darren 'Spanner' Eade

Assistant Coach: Debra Bonde

Team Manager: Kim Eade/ Jacqui French

Runner: Kim Eade

2016 season 
The 2016 saw new head coach Jaime Bradley take the reins. Bradley lead the team to their second Premiership and she won the NW AFLTAS Coach of the Year Award.

Head Coach: Jaime Bradley

Director of Female Football Development: Guy ‘Chalky’ Grey

Team Manager: Jen Sweeny

Runner: Various

2017 season 
2017 sees the start of a new generation of Burnie Dockers.  Burnie is now the only State League club on the NW coast and therefore access to talent from Latrobe through to the West Coast.  Starting the 2017 only sees 9 premiership players returning to the club

Head Coach – Sophie Edwards

Assistant Coach – Emma Humphries

Team Manager – Fern Messenger

Runner – various

AFL Women's Drafted Players

2016 Draft 
 Pick 57 - Emma Humphries (Melbourne)
 Pick 69 - Ellyse Gamble (Western Bulldogs)
 Pick 141 - Brittany Gibson (Brisbane Lions)

2017 Draft

References

Sport in Burnie, Tasmania
Women's Australian rules football clubs in Australia